Waimiha Sawmilling Company Limited v Waione Timber Company NZGazLawRp 32; [1923] NZLR 1137; (1923) 25 GLR 353 is a cited case in New Zealand land law.

References

Property law of New Zealand
1923 in New Zealand
Court of Appeal of New Zealand cases